Boutella is an Algerian surname that can refer to:
 Safy Boutella (born 1950), Algerian musician, arranger, composer, and record producer 
 Sofia Boutella (born 1982),  Algerian actress, model, and dancer, daughter of Safy Boutella